Champion Allison (born November 5, 1998) is an American athlete specializing in the 400 metres, who competes collegiately for the Florida Gators.

At the 2022 USA Outdoor Track and Field Championships, Allison placed second in the 400m in a time of 43.70 seconds, which was the tenth fastest time in world history.

References

1998 births
Living people
American male sprinters
Florida Gators men's track and field athletes
Alabama Crimson Tide men's track and field athletes
African-American track and field athletes
Track and field athletes from Houston